Adama is a city in Ethiopia.

Adama may also refer to:

 Adama (album), a 1998 Avishai Cohen recording
 Adama (Battlestar Galactica), various characters from Battlestar Galactica
 Adama (biblical), one of the Old Testament "Cities of the Plain"
 Adama (film), a 2015 French film
 Adama (name)
 Adama (woreda), a district in Ethiopia
 Adama Agricultural Solutions, an Israel-based crop protection company

See also
 Adamas (disambiguation)